Khallar is a village in the Daryapur taluka of Amravati district in Amravati division of Vidarbha region of Maharashtra state in India.

There is a police station at the village. Ancestor of Devisingh Ransingh Shekhawat had migrated here from Rajasthan about a century ago.

References

Villages in Amravati district